Polygrammopsis is a monotypic moth genus of the family Crambidae described by Eugene G. Munroe in 1960. Its only species, Polygrammopsis forsteri, described in the same paper, is found in Ecuador.

References

Spilomelinae
Taxa named by Eugene G. Munroe
Crambidae genera
Monotypic moth genera